Neenah High School is a public high school located in Neenah, Wisconsin. It is the only traditional high school of the Neenah Joint School District. As of fall 2008, approximately 2250 students were enrolled in grades 9 through 12, making it one of the largest schools in the state.  The school colors are red and white and the mascot is the rocket.

History 
Originally named Armstrong High School after Neil Armstrong, the current high school building was built in the 1970s. A middle school (Conant Jr High School) on the same campus, constructed in the late 1960s, was made a part of Armstrong in the 1980s, prompting a name change to Neenah High School. A third building connecting the two was built in the 1990s. A successful 2020 referendum budgeted $115 million for a new high school to be built in the town of Neenah, although the village of Fox Crossing later annexed the land. The new building is set to open for the 2023-24 school year. After this the old building will be converted to a new middle school replacing Shattuck Middle School.

Academics 
Before the 2019–2020 school year, NHS switched from a traditional daily schedule to a block schedule. Advanced Placement classes are offered at Neenah, and about 30 percent of students take an AP exam.

Extracurricular activities

Athletics 

Rockets athletic teams have a rivalry with nearby high school Kimberly. The Rockets' boys' basketball team finished second in Division I at the state basketball tournament in 2014. The boys' cross country team won the state championship in 1963, and 2018.

Performing arts 
Neenah has two competitive show choirs, an advanced group called Vintage and an intermediate group called Act II. Additionally Neenah High School has one advanced orchestra group known as Touch of Class, a group which often performs around the Fox Valley and abroad

Media 
Neenah High was featured on an episode of the MTV television series If You Really Knew Me which aired on Tuesday, September 14, 2010.

Notable alumni 
 William Draheim, Democratic and Republican state legislator
 Zuhdi Jasser, medical doctor, activist, policy board member
Phil Johnston (filmmaker), screenwriter of Wreck-It Ralph and Zootopia
 Dick Jorgensen, NFL referee, Super Bowl XXIV
 Kris Kelderman college and professional soccer defender and head coach for the Milwaukee Panthers men's soccer team
 Peter Konz, Center for the Atlanta Falcons
 Wayne Kreklow, guard for the Boston Celtics
 David Martin, Republican state legislator
 Frederick Petersen, physiotherapist and Republican state legislator
 John Schneller, End for the Detroit Lions
 Donna J. Seidel, police officer and Democratic state legislator
 John Whitlinger, professional tennis player and collegiate tennis coach

References

External links 

Neenah Joint School District website
Fox Valley Association website
Max Preps – Neenah Rockets

Public high schools in Wisconsin
Schools in Winnebago County, Wisconsin
1960s establishments in Wisconsin
Educational institutions with year of establishment missing